The 67th National Film Awards were announced at a press meet on 22 March 2021 to honour the best Indian films certified in India between 1 January and 31 December 2019. The awards ceremony, at which the Directorate of Film Festivals presents its annual National Film Awards to honour the best in Indian cinema, was originally slated to be held on 3 May 2020. It was postponed due to the COVID-19 pandemic, and was presented on 25 October 2021.

Selection process
The Directorate of Film Festivals invited online entries and the acceptable last date for entries was until 17 February 2020. Feature and Non-Feature Films certified by Central Board of Film Certification between 1 January 2019, and 31 December 2019, were eligible for the film award categories. Books, critical studies, reviews or articles on cinema published in Indian newspapers, magazines, and journals between 1 January 2019, and 31 December 2019, were eligible for the best writing on cinema section. Entries of dubbed, revised or copied versions of a film or translation, abridgements, edited or annotated works and reprints were ineligible for the awards.

For the Feature and Non-Feature Films sections, films in any Indian language, shot on 16 mm, 35 mm, a wider film gauge or a digital format, and released in cinemas, on video or digital formats for home viewing were eligible. Films were required to be certified as a feature film, a featurette or a Documentary/Newsreel/Non-Fiction by the Central Board of Film Certification.

Dadasaheb Phalke Award 
Introduced in 1969, the Dadasaheb Phalke Award is the highest award given to recognise the contributions of film personalities towards the development of Indian cinema and for distinguished contributions to the medium, its growth and promotion."

A committee consisting five eminent personalities from Indian film industry was appointed to evaluate the lifetime achievement award, Dadasaheb Phalke Award. Following were the jury members:

 Jury Members

Best Film Friendly State 
The awards aim at encouraging study and appreciation of cinema as an art form and dissemination of information and critical appreciation of this art-form through a State Government Policy.
Jury

Feature films

Jury

Golden Lotus Awards
Official Name: Swarna Kamal

All the awardees are awarded with 'Golden Lotus Award (Swarna Kamal)', a certificate and cash prize.

Silver Lotus Award
Official Name: Rajat Kamal

All the awardees are awarded with 'Silver Lotus Award (Rajat Kamal)', a certificate and cash prize.

Regional awards
National Film Awards are also given to the best films in the regional languages of India. Awards for the regional languages are categorised as per their mention in the Eighth schedule of the Constitution of India. Awardees included producers and directors of the film. No films in languages other than those specified in the Schedule VIII of the Constitution were eligible.

Best Feature Film in Each of the Language Other Than Those Specified In the Schedule VIII of the Constitution

Non-Feature Films
Short Films made in any Indian language and certified by the Central Board of Film Certification as a documentary/newsreel/fiction are eligible for non-feature film section.

Jury

Golden Lotus Award
Official Name: Swarna Kamal

All the awardees are awarded with 'Golden Lotus Award (Swarna Kamal)', a certificate and cash prize.

Silver Lotus Award
Official Name: Rajat Kamal

All the Awardees are awarded with 'Silver Lotus Award (Rajat Kamal)' and cash prize.

Best Writing on Cinema
The awards aim at encouraging study and appreciation of cinema as an art form and dissemination of information and critical appreciation of this art-form through publication of books, articles, reviews etc.

Jury
A committee of three, headed by Utpal Borpujari was appointed to evaluate the nominations for the best writing on Indian cinema. The jury members were as follows:

Golden Lotus Award
Official Name: Swarna Kamal

All the awardees are awarded with the Golden Lotus Award (Swarna Kamal) accompanied with a cash prize.

Special Mention
All the awardees are awarded with a certificate.

References

External links
 Official Page of the 67th National Film Awards, Directorate of Film Festivals, India
 National Film Awards Archives
 Official Page for Directorate of Film Festivals, India

2020 Indian film awards
Na
National Film Awards, 2020
National Film Awards (India) ceremonies